Rouvreux is a village of Wallonia and a district of the municipality of Sprimont, located in the province of Liège, Belgium. 

It is named after the hamlet at its centre. It was a municipality of its own from its creation on 21 May 1886 (by the merger of parts of the municipalities of Aywaille and Sprimont) until the merger of municipalities in 1977.

External links
 

1886 establishments in Belgium
1977 disestablishments in Belgium
Former municipalities of Liège Province
Sprimont